James Churchill Oliver (August 6, 1895 – December 25, 1986) was a U.S. Representative from Maine. He served three consecutive congressional terms as a Republican from 1937 to 1943, then later served a fourth term as a Democrat from 1959 to 1961.

Early life and career
Born in South Portland, Maine, Oliver attended the public schools and Bowdoin College in Brunswick, Maine, receiving an A.B. degree in 1917.

He enlisted in the United States Army on June 4, 1917, attended the Plattsburg Barracks Training Camp, and was commissioned a captain on November 27, 1917. He was promoted to major of Infantry on October 9, 1918, and transferred to the Inspector General's Department until honorably discharged on July 22, 1919.

He engaged in the general insurance business in Portland, Maine from 1930 to 1937. He served as member of the board of aldermen of South Portland, Maine, in 1932 and 1933.

Political career

Congress
Oliver was elected as a Republican to the Seventy-fifth, Seventy-sixth, and Seventy-seventh Congresses (January 3, 1937 – January 3, 1943). He was an unsuccessful candidate for renomination in 1942.

Lieutenant Governor
He served as lieutenant commander in the United States Coast Guard from January 26, 1943, to April 23, 1946. In 1946 he engaged in the real estate and insurance business in Maine and California.

He was an unsuccessful Democratic candidate for governor in 1952.

Return to Congress
He was an unsuccessful Democratic candidate for Congress in 1954 and 1956. He unsuccessfully contested the election of Robert Hale to the Eighty-fifth Congress in 1956.

Oliver was elected as a Democrat to the Eighty-sixth Congress (January 3, 1959 – January 3, 1961). He was an unsuccessful candidate for reelection in 1960 to the Eighty-seventh Congress.

He served as delegate to the 1960 Democratic National Convention.

Later career and death
He was a real estate developer in Cape Elizabeth, Maine. He moved to Orlando, Florida, where he died December 25, 1986.

References

1895 births
1986 deaths
Bowdoin College alumni
Politicians from South Portland, Maine
People from Cape Elizabeth, Maine
United States Army officers
Maine city council members
Republican Party members of the United States House of Representatives from Maine
Democratic Party members of the United States House of Representatives from Maine
20th-century American politicians